Jeanne Crassous is a French chemist who is a Professor and Director of Research at the French National Centre for Scientific Research (CNRS). She leads the Marie Skłodowska-Curie Actions International Training Network HEL4CHIROLED.

Early life and education 

Crassous completed her undergraduate studies at the Ecole Normale Supérieure de Lyon. Her doctoral research involved investigations into the absolute configuration of bromochlorofluoromethane, which she investigated using Raman optical activity. After earning her doctorate, Crassous moved to ETH Zurich, where she joined the research group of François Diederich investigating the chirality of fullerenes.

Research and career 
Crassous investigates π-conjugated chiral systems. She returned to École normale supérieure de Lyon in 1998, where she worked with Laure Guy and Jean-Pierre Dutasta optical properties of chiral molecules. In 2005, she moved to the Institut des Sciences Chimiques de Rennes, where she joined the research group of Régis Réau. Crassous was made Director of Research at the French National Centre for Scientific Research (CNRS) in 2010.

At the CNRS, Crassous leads the research programme CHIRAFUN, in which research teams investigate the molecular and supramolecular chirality of chiral materials. She has investigated the stereochemistry of a range of small molecules, including fullerenes, helicenes and organometallic complexes. In 2020 Crassous became the coordinator of HEL4CHIROLED, a collaborative international programme that looks to develop efficient organic light-emitting diodes from chiral materials.

Crassous serves on the editorial board of the Wiley journal Chirality.

Awards and honours 
 2013 Distinguished member of the Société chimique de France
 2020 Société chimique de France Prix de la Division de Chimie Organique

Selected publications

References 

French women chemists
Living people
Research directors of the French National Centre for Scientific Research
ENS Fontenay-Saint-Cloud-Lyon alumni
Academic journal editors
Year of birth missing (living people)